Paudie Kehoe (born 1990) is an Irish hurler who plays as a left corner-forward for the Carlow senior team.

Kehoe made his first appearance for the team during the 2009 Christy Ring Cup and has become a regular member of the starting fifteen since then. During that time he has won one Christy Ring Cup medal.

At the club level, Kehoe has won four county championship medal with St Mullin's.

Honours
 Carlow Senior Hurling Championship (4) 2010, 2014, 2015 (c), 2016
 Christy Ring Cup (1) 2009
 National Hurling League Division 2A (1) 2012

References

1990 births
Living people
Carlow inter-county hurlers
St Mullin's hurlers